The St. Paul Group is a geologic group in West Virginia. It dates back to the Ordovician period.

References
 Generalized Stratigraphic Chart for West Virginia

Ordovician West Virginia